Bhai Balmukund (1889 – 8 May 1915) was an Indian revolutionary freedom fighter. He was sentenced to death and hanged by the British Raj for his role in Delhi conspiracy case.  He was a cousin of another revolutionary Bhai Parmanand, who was a founder member of Ghadar Party.

Earlier life
Bhai Balmukund was born in a Hindu Mohyal family on 1889 at village Kariala in Jhelum district (now in Pakistan).  His father's name was Bhai Mathura Das. His family hailed from a famous martyr of Hindu history Bhai Mati Das from whom they attached the epithet Bhai to their names.  Balmukund's interest in national movement aroused when he was a student.  After graduation, he took the profession of teaching, but his attachments to the national movement made him an ardent nationalist.

Revolutionary activities
On 23 December 1912, when Lord Hardinge was marching in a state through the Chandni Chowk, Delhi, a bomb was thrown on him.  The Viceroy received minor injuries only, but his attendant was killed. Another bomb was thrown at some Europeans at Lawrence Garden, Lahore five months later on 17 May 1913. Following investigations, Balmukund was arrested from Jodhpur, where he was working as a tutor of the Jodhpur Maharaja's sons.

Death
A trial was held at Delhi after the investigations of the bombings and Balmukund was sentenced to death along with his companions Master Amir Chand, Awadh Behari, and Basanta Kumar Biswas on 5 October 1914. He was hanged in the Old Delhi Jail near Delhi Gate on 8 May 1915 at the age of 26.

References

Bibliogrpahy

Indian revolutionaries
1915 deaths
1889 births
Revolutionary movement for Indian independence
People from Jhelum